Swamp Thing is a steel roller coaster located at Wild Adventures in Valdosta, Georgia.  It opened at Wild Adventures in 2003 mainly as an introduction coaster for children. Swamp Thing is a standard Vekoma Suspended Family Coaster with alligator-themed scenery.

External links
Swamp Thing at www.wildadventures.net

Roller coasters in Georgia (U.S. state)
Roller coasters introduced in 2003
Suspended Family Coaster roller coasters
Wild Adventures
Roller coasters operated by Herschend Family Entertainment